Krišjānis is a Latvian masculine given name and masculine surname. The feminine version of the surname is Krišjāne. It is the Latvian version of the name Christian and may refer to:

Given name
Krišjānis Barons (1835–1923), Latvian writer and historian
Krišjānis Berķis (1884–1942), Latvian military general
Krišjānis Kariņš (born 1964), Latvian politician
Krisjānis Kundziņš (1905–1993), Latvian wrestler
Krišjānis Rēdlihs (born 1981), Latvian ice hockey player
Krišjānis Tūtāns (born 1983), Latvian windsurfer 
Krišjānis Valdemārs (1825–1891), Latvian writer, editor, educator, politician, lexicographer, folklorist and economist
Krišjānis Zeļģis (born 1985), Latvian poet and brewer

Surname
Dimants Krišjānis (born 1960), Latvian rower and Olympic competitor
Dzintars Krišjānis (born 1958), Latvian rower and Olympic competitor

Latvian masculine given names
Latvian-language masculine surnames